The 2007 Toyota Grand Prix of Long Beach was the third round of the 2007 American Le Mans Series season.  It took place on April 14, 2007.

Official results
Class winners in bold.  Cars failing to complete 70% of winner's distance marked as Not Classified (NC).

Statistics
 Pole Position - #26 Andretti Green Racing - 1:11.838
 Fastest Lap - #26 Andretti Green Racing - 1:13.418

External links
  

Longbeach
Grand Prix of Long Beach